Union is a ghost town in Brazos County, in the U.S. state of Texas. It is located within the Bryan-College Station metropolitan area.

History
The area in what is now Union today may have first been settled in the early 1900s. It only had a church and several scattered dwellings in the 1930s, but never had a population recorded.

Geography

Education
Union had its own school in the 1930s. Today, Union is located within the Bryan Independent School District.

References

Ghost towns in Texas